Plamondon Bay is a body of freshwater located in the western part of Gouin Reservoir, in the territory of the town of La Tuque, in the administrative region of the Mauricie, in the province of Quebec, in Canada.

This bay extends mainly in the township of Hanotaux (western part) and in the township of Crémazie.

Recreotourism activities are the main economic activity of the sector. Forestry comes second.

The hydrographic slope of Plamondon Bay is served by the R1045 forest road from the village of Obedjiwan, Quebec and passing on the northwest side of the Gouin Reservoir, as well as by the R1009 forest road passing on the west side Plamondon Bay and Hanotaux Bay. A secondary road (North-South direction and with several forest branches) serves the west side of Plamondon Bay and Plamondon Creek; another road (North-South direction) passes on the east side.

The surface of Plamondon Bay is usually frozen from mid-November to the end of April, however safe ice circulation is generally from early December to the end of March.

Geography 
The
main hydrographic slopes near Plamondon Bay are:
north side: Plamondon Creek, Berthelot River, Pascagama River, De la Rencontre Creek;
east side: Gouin Reservoir, Du Mâle Lake, Bourgeois Lake (Gouin Reservoir), Toussaint Lake, Marmette Lake, Bureau Lake (Gouin Reservoir) (North Bay);
south side: Hanotaux Bay, Adolphe-Poisson Bay, Mattawa Bay, Saraana Bay, Bignell Creek, Flapjack River;
west side: Berthelot River, Pascagama River, Saint-Cyr Lake (Saint-Cyr River South), Cherrier Lake, Mégiscane River and Mercier Lake.

This body of water is described as follows:
the northern part of the bay stretches over  forming several secondary bays and collecting the waters of Plamondon Creek (coming from the North);
the southwestern part includes a bay of  stretching as far as the canton of Hanotaux;
This part of the bay stretches to the south-east to the exit of the bay which narrows through two straits of a width of about 200 meters each before reaching the west shore of the Du Mâle Lake (Gouin Reservoir).

The mouth of Plamondon Bay is located in the Southeast at:
 southeast of the mouth of Plamondon Creek;
 west of the mouth of the Kaopatinak Pass which connects the southwestern part of the Du Mâle Lake (Gouin Reservoir) and the bays of the Southwest, to rest of Gouin Reservoir;
 south-west of the village center of Obedjiwan, Quebec which is located on a peninsula on the north shore of Gouin Reservoir;
 west of Gouin Dam;
 northwest of the village center of Wemotaci, Quebec (north shore of the Saint-Maurice River);
 north-west of downtown La Tuque;
 northwest of the mouth of the Saint-Maurice River (confluence with the St. Lawrence River at Trois-Rivières).

 northeasterly across the western part of Gouin Reservoir including the Du Mâle Lake to the south of Obedjiwan, Quebec;
 to the east, crossing in particular Marmette Lake, then to the South-East crossing notably Brochu Lake, then towards across the Kikendatch Bay until Gouin Dam.

From this dam, the current flows along the Saint-Maurice River to Trois-Rivières where it flows onto the North Shore of the St. Lawrence River.

Toponymy
The term "Plamondon" is a family name of French origin.

The toponym "Baie Plamondon" was formalized on December 5, 1968, by the Commission de toponymie du Québec, at the creation of this commission.

Notes and references

See also 

Saint-Maurice River, a watercourse
Gouin Reservoir, a body of water
Du Mâle Lake, a body of water
Plamondon Creek, a watercourse
La Tuque, a city
List of lakes in Canada

Bays of Quebec
La Tuque, Quebec